Royal Air Force Sandtoft or more simply RAF Sandtoft is a former Royal Air Force station in North Lincolnshire between Doncaster, South Yorkshire and Scunthorpe, North Lincolnshire, England.

History

Second World War
RAF Sandtoft opened in February 1944 as a satellite airfield to RAF Lindholme which was 3 miles to the west.

No. 1 Group RAF, RAF Bomber Command based a number of aircraft here from the No. 1667 Heavy Conversion Unit RAF, including Handley Page Halifaxes from RAF Faldingworth and Avro Lancasters.

In November 1944 the airfield transferred to No. 7 Group RAF Bomber Command.

The RAF station closed on 10 November 1945.

Post Second World War
After the Second World War, the airfield was placed on care and maintenance and remained inactive until allocated to the United States Air Force on 1 April 1953. The station was never occupied by the USAF and returned to Air Ministry control on 8 September 1955 for disposal.

Today many of the original buildings still exist. However, much of the old RAF Station has been converted to commercial use and a section of perimeter track is maintained and used by a flying club. The Trolleybus Museum at Sandtoft also uses part of the site.

See also
List of former Royal Air Force stations

References

Citations

Bibliography

External links
 https://web.archive.org/web/20050306010643/http://www.oldairfields.fotopic.net/c188322.html

Sandtoft
Sandtoft
Epworth, Lincolnshire